The Crocodile is a 2005 Cambodian horror-action film written and directed by Mao Ayuth. First released in July 2005, it had been periodically re-released in Cambodian cinemas since July 2007, and remains unreleased on DVD or digitally.

Plot 
A group of villagers live by a river heavily infested with crocodiles which have killed many of their relatives. A local farmer, San, decides to become a crocodile hunter following the death of his wife, family members, neighbours and friends, with the aim of finding and killing the Crocodile King.

Production and release 
The film's budget was US$100, 000, a high level for a Cambodian production; a significant amount of this went towards the film's lead actor, Preap Sovath. The film was written, produced and directed by Mao Ayuth, who was one of the few filmmakers from the golden age of Cambodian cinema to survive the Khmer Rouge regime. The film was first released in July 2005 in six theatres across Cambodia. It has subsequently been released several more times since then. As of March 2021, the film has not been released on DVD or streaming platforms; a viral Facebook post asked for the film's release using the hashtag "#releaseនេសាទក្រពើ".

Awards 
The Crocodile won six awards at the Khmer National Film Celebration, including Best Movie, Best Director and Best Writer for Mao Ayuth, and Best Actor for Preap Sovath.

References

External links 
 

Khmer-language films
2005 horror films
Natural horror films
Cambodian horror films
2005 films